Franck Le Normand (born 22 November 1931) is a French cyclist. He competed in the men's sprint and the tandem events at the 1952 Summer Olympics.

References

External links
 

1931 births
Living people
French male cyclists
Olympic cyclists of France
Cyclists at the 1952 Summer Olympics
Cyclists from Paris